Zarszyn  (Zarshyn) is a village in Sanok County, Subcarpathian Voivodeship, in south-eastern Poland. It is the seat of the gmina (administrative district) called Gmina Zarszyn.

See also
 Walddeutsche

References

Villages in Sanok County
Ruthenian Voivodeship
Kingdom of Galicia and Lodomeria
Lwów Voivodeship